Fremantle Peak is a peak,  high, standing  northeast of the Dome, near the summit of Heard Island. It was surveyed in 1948 by the Australian National Antarctic Research Expeditions, and named by them after the port of Fremantle, the final point of embarkation for the expedition.

References

Mountains of Heard Island and McDonald Islands